The Students' league of the Conservative Party is the student wing of the Conservative Party of Norway. It was founded in 1961 under the name Norway's Conservative Students' League. , Henrik Erevik Riise is the leader of the league. The organisation is a founding member of the European Democrat Students.

Leaders

References

External links

Student wings of conservative parties
International Young Democrat Union